Melanochromis is a genus of haplochromine cichlids endemic to Lake Malawi in Eastern Africa. Ecologically, they belong to the rock-dwelling mbuna cichlids of Lake Malawi.

Melanochromis are typically small, slim but muscular fishes with lengthwise stripes of black, yellow and blue. They usually display strong sexual dichromatism.

Species
There are currently 15 recognized species in this genus:
 Melanochromis auratus (Boulenger, 1897) (Golden Mbuna, Auratus Cichlid, Malawi Golden Cichlid)
 Melanochromis baliodigma Bowers & Stauffer, 1997
 Melanochromis chipokae D. S. Johnson, 1975
 Melanochromis dialeptos Bowers & Stauffer, 1997
 Melanochromis heterochromis Bowers & Stauffer, 1993
 Melanochromis kaskazini Konings-Dudin, Konings & Stauffer, 2009
 Melanochromis lepidiadaptes Bowers & Stauffer, 1997
 Melanochromis loriae D. S. Johnson, 1975
 Melanochromis melanopterus Trewavas, 1935
 Melanochromis mossambiquensis Konings-Dudin, Konings & Stauffer, 2009
 Melanochromis mpoto Konings & Stauffer, 2012.
 Melanochromis robustus D. S. Johnson, 1985
 Melanochromis simulans Eccles, 1973
 Melanochromis vermivorus Trewavas, 1935 (Purple Mbuna)
 Melanochromis wochepa Konings-Dudin, Konings & Stauffer, 2009

References

 
Haplochromini

Cichlid genera
Taxa named by Ethelwynn Trewavas